Valtteri Kemiläinen (born 16 December 1991) is a Finnish professional ice hockey player for Rögle BK of the Swedish Hockey League (SHL).

Playing career
Kemiläinen made his Liiga debut playing with JYP Jyväskylä during the 2013–14 Liiga season. He later joined Tappara, in which he played 5 professional seasons with before leaving as a free agent following the 2020–21 season.

On May 21, 2021, Kemiläinen left the Liiga and signed his first contract abroad in agreeing to a one-year deal with Russian club, HC Vityaz of the Kontinental Hockey League (KHL).

Career statistics

International

References

External links

1991 births
Living people
JYP-Akatemia players
JYP Jyväskylä players
Finnish ice hockey defencemen
Sportspeople from Jyväskylä
Ice hockey players at the 2022 Winter Olympics
Olympic ice hockey players of Finland
Medalists at the 2022 Winter Olympics
Olympic gold medalists for Finland
Olympic medalists in ice hockey
Rögle BK players
Tappara players
HC Vityaz players
21st-century Finnish people